A number of steamships were named Kampar, including:-

, a Straits Steamship Company cargo ship in service 1905-35, requisitioned by the Royal Navy as 
, a Straits Steamship company cargo ship in service 1947-57

Ship names